The 2008 Mississippi Republican presidential primary took place on March 11, 2008. The only candidates that were still in the race were Senator John McCain, Congressman Ron Paul, and Alan Keyes. John McCain easily won this primary.

Results

* Candidate withdrew from the race before the primary

See also
 Mississippi Democratic primary, 2008
 Republican Party (United States) presidential primaries, 2008

References

2008 Mississippi elections
Mississippi
Mississippi Republican primaries